Naroulia is a town in the Gomel Region, Belarus. It has a population of 8,026, as of 2021. In 1986, the city experienced heavy radioactive fallout from the Chernobyl accident. Today it is located on the border of Polesie State Radioecological Reserve.

Gallery

References

Towns in Belarus
Populated places in Gomel Region
Minsk Voivodeship
Rechitsky Uyezd
Naroulia District